Springbrook Nature Center is a  park and nature reserve located in Fridley, Minnesota.  Springbrook features an interpretive building, over three miles (5 km) of hiking trails through wooded and wetland areas, and various public shelters. The mission of Springbrook Nature Center is to preserve the integrity of and enable access to the natural resource base.

Throughout the year, Springbrook hosts various educational programs and community events. It receives approximately 150,000 visitors per year. There is a monthly bird-banding conducted at the Nature Center.

History
In 1970, Fridley began purchasing land which would become the Springbrook Nature Center.

On July 18, 1986, a widely photographed tornado spent 16 minutes in Springbrook Nature Center, destroying thousands of century old trees and extensive areas of mature forest habitat. Well-known aerial footage of the tornado was filmed by a KARE 11 television news helicopter passing through the area.

A new interpretive center was dedicated on July 30, 2016. The Springbrook Nature Center Foundation raised (US)$5.5million towards the expansion.

Long-time (35 years) director, Siah St. Clair, provided many photos for a book, A Field Guide to the Natural World of the Twin Cities, published in 2018.

Bibliography

References

External links

Springbrook Nature Center Foundation 
Fridley, MN

Nature centers in Minnesota
Regional parks in Minnesota
Fridley, Minnesota
Protected areas of Anoka County, Minnesota
Education in Anoka County, Minnesota
Tourist attractions in Anoka County, Minnesota